Abraham Schermerhorn (1783–1850) was a prominent American merchant in New York City.

Abraham Schermerhorn may also refer to:

 Abraham M. Schermerhorn (1791–1855), a member of the U.S. House of Representatives and Mayor of Rochester, New York

See also
 Schermerhorn (disambiguation)